Emperor of the Fading Suns is a turn-based strategy 4X video game developed by Holistic Design, based on their in-house role-playing game setting Fading Suns. It was released for Microsoft Windows in February 1997.

The game had a wide array of units and a complex back-story but was rushed to market and released with numerous severe flaws and several features underdeveloped. In patched form, it survives as a popular abandonware title with numerous unofficial, fan-made mods. On October 19, 2020, it was made available on GOG.com.

Gameplay
The game is played on a galactic map and specific planet maps. Planet maps use a hexa-grid system for movement. Individual units and buildings take up a single grid space. Several menus handle diplomacy, chat, and documentation. In the game, the player controls a feudal lord of a noble house amongst the ruins of a galactic empire. The player must battle other noble houses and rally enough support to be crowned Emperor of the galaxy. The player can start as one of five houses; each has its own advantages and disadvantages. During game setup, the player can customize their house, taking some negative traits such as insanity in exchange for more positive traits, like having all the player's units start out better trained. Each house starts on its respective home planet, and houses starting on temperate planets have an early-game advantage over houses that start on frozen or jungle planets. There are several non-player groups in the game, including the Symbiots, Vau, the Guild, and the Church. In total, there are forty-three planets that can be explored, colonized, and fought over.

Reception

Next Generation rated it four stars out of five, and stated that "With everything from basic combat to diplomatic backstabbing, Emperor of the Fading Suns has a depth of play that is worthy of a classic strategy game." Personal Computer Magazine described the game as "destined to be a classic" in their 1997 review, but also noted that the game suffered from bugs.

Reviews
Gamezilla (1997)
GameSpot (Mar 25, 1997)
The Duelist (August 1997)

Legacy
After the end-of-support by the developer, the fan-community took over the support by creating player-made unofficial patches for the game. These try to fix bugs and/or enhance the game by adding new units and balancing out old ones (modding). For example, the "Hyperion patch" makes it possible for the Symbiots to build additional organic spaceships, so they are not stranded on their home planet if their initial fleet is destroyed.

References

External links
 Official Webpage (archived in 1998)
 Official SegaSoft Webpage (archived in 1997)
 

1997 video games
Turn-based strategy video games
Computer wargames
4X video games
Holistic Design games
North America-exclusive video games
Multiplayer and single-player video games
Sega video games
Video games based on tabletop role-playing games
Video games developed in the United States
Windows games
Windows-only games